Jay Joshua Herdman (born August 14, 2004) is a professional soccer player who currently plays for Whitecaps FC 2 of MLS Next Pro. Born in New Zealand, he has represented both Canada and New Zealand at youth level.

Club career

Vancouver Whitecaps
In March 2022, Herdman signed a contract with Whitecaps FC 2. He made his professional debut on March 26 against Houston Dynamo 2.

International career
Herdman is eligible for New Zealand through birth, England through parentage and Canada through residency. In April 2022 he received a call-up to the Canadian under-20 side for two friendly matches against Costa Rica.

In August 2022, he was named in the New Zealand U20 squad to contest the 2022 OFC U-19 Championship in Tahiti. On 7 September 2022, Herdman made his debut for the New Zealand U20's and scored against Cook Islands U20 in an 8–0 win. New Zealand went on to win the OFC U-19 Championship, qualifying for the 2023 FIFA U-20 World Cup. Herdman was awarded the Golden Ball for the tournament.

Personal life
Herdman is the oldest child of current Canada head coach John Herdman.

Honours
New Zealand
 OFC U-19 Championship: 2022

Individual
OFC U-19 Championship Golden Ball: 2022

References

2004 births
Living people
Sportspeople from Invercargill
New Zealand association footballers
New Zealand youth international footballers
Canadian soccer players
Canada men's youth international soccer players
New Zealand people of English descent
Canadian people of English descent
New Zealand emigrants to Canada
Association football midfielders
Whitecaps FC 2 players
MLS Next Pro players